Musical Romance (Spanish:Romance musical) is a 1941 Cuban film directed by Ernesto Caparrós and starring Rosita Fornés.

Cast
 Esther Borja 
 Aníbal de Mar 
 Rosita Fornés 
 Rita Montaner 
 Otto Sirgo

References

Bibliography 
 Alfonso J. García Osuna. The Cuban Filmography: 1897 through 2001. McFarland, 2003.

External links 
 

1941 films
1940s Spanish-language films
Cuban black-and-white films
Cuban musical films
1940s romantic musical films